The Liverpool Astronomical Society was founded in 1881 in Liverpool, England, as a society to promote and coordinate amateur astronomy.

In 1893 the Society was gifted a 5" (125mm) aperture Cooke equatorial telescope and a 2” (50mm) transit telescope by Thomas Rylands. An observatory was built for it on the roof of the William Brown building in central Liverpool. However from around 1899 the society ceased activities, only for it to be revived in July 1901. Four Liverpool Astronomical Society Members joined the British Astronomical Association expedition to observe the total solar eclipse of 30 August 1905. A second period of inactivity occurred during and after the First World War from 1914 until 1922. The Cooke telescope is still owned by the society, but is currently unused.

The Society’s current observatory, known as the Leighton Observatory, is at Pex Hill, Cronton, Merseyside outside Liverpool. It was formerly known as Pex Hill Observatory and Visitors' Centre.

Presidents
Partial list 1881 to 1925.

1881–1882, unknown
1882–1884, Richard Coward Johnson
1884–1885, Thomas Henry Espinall Compton Espin
1885–1886, Isaac Roberts
1887–1888, William Frederick Denning
1888–1889, Thomas Gwyn Elger
1889–1890, Stephen Joseph Perry
1890–1893, William Benjamin Hutchinson
1893–1894, James Gill
1894–1897, William Edward Plummer
1897–1899, George Higgs
1899–1901, society inactive
1901–1914, William Edward Plummer
1914–1922, society inactive
1923–1925, Harold  Whichello

Special Observer

The laws of the Society provided for a ‘Special Observer’. The Observer was to have control of the Society’s Observatory to

1 Corroborate the observations of Society Members.
2 Assist Members requiring practical help in observational Astronomy.
3 Undertake systematic observations on behalf of the Society.
T H E C Espin was appointed as special observer while living at West Kirby. To show compliance with task 3 Espin published ‘A Catalogue of the Magnitudes of 500 Stars in Auriga, Gemini and Leo Minor’ in volume three of the LAS Transactions in 1884. He also published ‘circulars’ to the membership of the society advising on objects suitable for observation.

He retained the title despite moving to Wolsingham in 1885 and Tow Law in 1888. However the title was rescinded when he resigned from the LAS in 1890.

See also 
 List of astronomical societies

References

External links
 LAS Website

Culture in Liverpool
Amateur astronomy organizations
British astronomy organisations
Organisations based in Liverpool
Organizations established in 1881
1881 establishments in England